Adolf Andreas Speyer (born 02 November 1960 in Floridsdorf, Vienna), best known by his stage name Andy Borg, is an Austrian Schlager singer and TV presenter. He lives in the Passau area and has been recording music since his debut album Adios Amor which was released as an English version in 1982. In 2006 he replaced Karl Moik as host of the popular ORF show Musikantenstadl. His most successful song was his debut "Adiós Amor" in 1982 which spent 39 weeks in the German charts.

Discography

Albums

References

External links

Official Website

Living people
1960 births
20th-century Austrian male singers
Schlager musicians
Musicians from Vienna
21st-century Austrian male singers